Struan is an unincorporated community in Eagle Creek Rural Municipality No. 376, Saskatchewan, Canada.

The community is named for Struan, Perthshire in Scotland, which had been the home of postmaster George R. Peters.

See also
 List of communities in Saskatchewan

References

Eagle Creek No. 376, Saskatchewan
Unincorporated communities in Saskatchewan